This was the fifth time India participated in Commonwealth Games. India participated in most sports this time, involving, Athletics, Badminton, Boxing, Weightlifting and Wrestling.

Athletics
India won silver in Men's Hammer Throw, where Praveen Kumar (actor) threw Hammer to a distance of 60.13m.

Badminton
Dinesh Khanna won first medal in Badminton for India in Commonwealth Games. He won Bronze medal. Gold and Silver was won by Malaysian players.

Weightlifting
India won Silver in Weightlifting too. In Men's 60 kg Combined, Mohon Lal Ghosh won silver. Arun K. Das, placed himself 5th in same event.

Wrestling
The Medal hunt in Wrestling continues for India in this games too. India won all three Gold medals this year in Wrestling only, with additional 2 Silver and 2 Bronze medals.

References

Nations at the 1966 British Empire and Commonwealth Games
India at the Commonwealth Games
1966 in Indian sport